The Tamgha-e-Bahaduro (Soldiers Medal) was a military decoration  awarded by the Azad Hind Government. First instituted by Subhas Chandra Bose in Germany, it was later also awarded to troops of the Indian National Army in South East Asia. The award could be conferred with swords for valour in combat, and without swords for non-combat awards.

See also

Indian National Army
Indische Legion

Military awards and decorations of Azad Hind